The Yiddish Wikipedia is the Yiddish-language version of Wikipedia. It was founded on March 3, 2004, and the first article was written November 28 of that year.

Current status
There are  registered users (including bots);  are active, including  administrators.

Like all Wikipedias it generates hits from Yiddish words typed in Google and other search engines, with Wikipedia articles often appearing at the top of the results for that word.

In accordance with the norms for the Yiddish language, it is written almost exclusively in Hebrew script, and not in Latin script.

Milestones 
The Yiddish Wikipedia reached 6,000 articles on March 8, 2009. The 6,000th article is יהושע העשיל תאומים-פרענקל, a rabbi. The 7,000th article is חנינא סגן הכהנים, a page about the tanna Hanina Segan ha-Kohanim created on December 24, 2009.

Point of view
Combined, the different Hasidic groups form the largest Yiddish-speaking community in the world today. Therefore, many new articles are about Hasidic rabbis.

Other examples of Yiddish Wikipedia's extensive coverage on Orthodox Judaism in general, and Hasidic Judaism in particular, are:
Yiddish Wikipedia's Main Page's covers Jewish topics extensively. Generally, at the top of the Main Page of any language Wikipedia is a list of links to portals or categories of general topics, for examples the arts, history, mathematics, and science. However, on the Yiddish Wikipedia Main Page, in addition to the usual links, there are links to the all-Jewish categories of Judaism, Hasidism, Sifrei Kodesh, the Holocaust, and Rabbis.
Yiddish Wikipedia's page about user pages lists the rules a user must follow when making his user page. As a suggestion, the article says a user should not write untrue things about themselves on their user page, for example "if you live in Williamsburg, it's not proper to write that you live in Lakewood." The two places mentioned in the example, Williamsburg and Lakewood, are home to very large and influential Orthodox Jewish communities.
On the Yiddish page for What Wikipedia is not, one of the sections is named "Wikipedia is not a mikveh". The name is based on the idea that Jews who find themselves together in the mikveh (Jewish ritual bath) share with each other the latest news and rumors. This section tries to convey that short news tidbits and rumors should not be written on Wikipedia, especially when unsourced.
On the Yiddish page about Yiddish Wikipedia, five reasons are listed as to the purpose of Yiddish Wikipedia in addition to simply being a free encyclopedia, with four of them being Judaism-related, and more specifically, related to the Haredi Jewish community (a subgroup of Orthodox Judaism which includes Hasidic Judaism). For example, about one of the reasons − to create Torah study, the following is written: "One [user] writes a sevara (Torah thought), reason, law, custom, or understanding [of the Torah], another [user] jumps up and questions it on the talk page, and changes it according to his conclusion, and the third makes a compromise. And so on until...a complete [discussion of] Torah is learned up."

Additional Judaism-related goals of Yiddish Wikipedia are to spread Judaism and to create a virtual Jewish community online.

Statistics

References

External links

  Yiddish Wikipedia
  Yiddish Wikipedia mobile version (homepage not yet configured)
 New Voices e-Gossip - If there ever was hope for our grandparents to turn tech-savvy and read about the latest in their mamaloshen, this is it. New Voices (magazine). 
 Go on the web: Aviv Gefen (with non-hebrew spelling)? Yes. It's not a mistake. It's Yiddish. Ynet (Hebrew)
 Dr. Shalom Berger, An encyclopedia of people already in Yiddish The Forward (Yiddish)
 Is there such a thing as a Free Encyclopedia?: - The Yiddish Wikipedia was the only Wikipedia which did not delete an article which a journalist has written his own autobiography. TheMarker (Hebrew)

Wikipedias by language
Yiddish-language mass media
Internet properties established in 2004
Wikipedias in Germanic languages